Clarck N'Sikulu (born 10 July 1992) is a Congolese professional footballer who is currently without a club.

Club career
Born in Lille, France, N'Sikulu joined Évian in January 2012 from Lille OSC. He made his Ligue 1 debut during the 2012/13 season. In his first season with Évian, he scored one goal out of six games. On 4 December 2013, he scored the opening goal in 2–0 home win over Paris Saint-Germain.

International career
N'Sikulu represented the DR Congo U20 at the 2013 Toulon Tournament.

References

1992 births
Living people
Footballers from Lille
Democratic Republic of the Congo footballers
Democratic Republic of the Congo under-20 international footballers
French footballers
French sportspeople of Democratic Republic of the Congo descent
Association football forwards
Thonon Evian Grand Genève F.C. players
Stade Lavallois players
Platanias F.C. players
Atromitos F.C. players
US Boulogne players
Ligue 1 players
Ligue 2 players
Championnat National players
Championnat National 2 players
Championnat National 3 players
Super League Greece players
Democratic Republic of the Congo expatriate footballers
Expatriate footballers in Greece
Democratic Republic of the Congo expatriate sportspeople in Greece
Black French sportspeople